Muneyoshi is a masculine Japanese given name. Notable people with the name include:

, Japanese daimyō 
, Japanese agricultural scholar
, Japanese sumo wrestler

See also
, Japanese samurai under the Tokugawa clan, whose name was misread by earlier scholars as Muneyoshi
  

Japanese masculine given names